Gilles E. Gignac is a research psychologist from Ontario, Canada currently serving as an associate professor in psychology at the University of Western Australia. He is known for his research on human intelligence and differential psychology.

References

External links
Staff profile

Personal blog

Australian psychologists
Living people
Intelligence researchers
Differential psychologists
Academic staff of the University of Western Australia
Laurentian University alumni
University of Western Ontario alumni
Swinburne University of Technology alumni
Year of birth missing (living people)